Triptolemus Evrychou is a Cypriot association football club based in Evrychou, located in the Nicosia District. Its colours are black and white. It has 8 participations in Cypriot Fourth Division.

References

Football clubs in Cyprus
Association football clubs established in 1937
1937 establishments in Cyprus